Pseudmelisa demiavis is a moth in the family Erebidae. It was described by William James Kaye in 1919. It is found in Cameroon.

References

Moths described in 1919
Syntomini